In physics, the meter water equivalent (often m.w.e. or mwe) is a standard measure of cosmic ray attenuation in underground laboratories. Because laboratories at the same depth (in meters) can have greatly varied levels of cosmic ray penetration, the m.w.e. provides a convenient and consistent way of comparing cosmic ray levels in different underground locations.

Cosmic ray attenuation is dependent on the density of the material of the overburden, so the m.w.e. is defined as the product of depth and density (also known as an interaction depth). Some publications use hg/cm² instead of m.w.e., although the two units are equivalent.

Soudan Mine, at  depth is only 8% deeper, but because it is in denser iron-rich rock it achieves 2100 m.w.e. shielding, 32% more.

Another factor that must be accounted for is the shape of the overburden. While some laboratories are located beneath a flat ground surface, many are located in tunnels in mountains. Thus, the distance to the surface in directions other than straight up is less than it would be assuming a flat surface.

The usual conversion between m.w.e. and total muon flux is given by Mei and Hime:

(The first term dominates for depths up to 1681.5 m.w.e.; below that, the second term dominates. Thus, for great depths, the factor of 4 mentioned above corresponds to a difference of 698 ln 4 ≈ 968 m.w.e.)

Standard rock 
In addition to m.w.e., underground laboratory depth can also be measured in meters of standard rock. Standard rock is defined to have mass number A = 22, atomic number Z = 11, and density . Because most laboratories are under earth and not underwater, the depth in standard rock is often closer to the actual underground depth of the laboratory.

Existing underground laboratories 
Underground laboratories exist at depths ranging from just below ground level to approximately 6000 m.w.e. at SNOLAB and 6700 m.w.e. at the Jinping Underground Laboratory in China.

References 

Equivalent units
Underground laboratories
Physical quantities